Hillcrest is the name of three places in New Zealand:

Hillcrest, Auckland, a suburb of Auckland
Hillcrest, Waikato, a suburb of Hamilton
Hillcrest, Rotorua a suburb of Rotorua, new Zealand